Dallasite is a breccia made of subequant to rectangular or distinctly elongate, curvilinear shards that represent the spalled rims of pillow basalt (see: Hyaloclastite). This material is commonly partly altered to chlorite, epidote, quartz and carbonate, for which the local term 'dallasite' has been coined.  The stone dallasite is named after Dallas Road, Victoria, British Columbia.  It is considered the unofficial stone of British Columbia's capital city.  Dallasite is found in Triassic volcanic rocks of Vancouver Island and is considered the third most important gem material in British Columbia.

References

Rocks
Gemstones
Geology of British Columbia
Breccias